Alien Nation is a science fiction police procedural television series in the Alien Nation franchise. Adapted from the 1988 Alien Nation movie, it stars Gary Graham as Detective Matthew Sikes, a Los Angeles police officer reluctantly working with "Newcomer" alien Sam "George" Francisco, played by Eric Pierpoint. Sikes also has an on again-off again flirtation with a female Newcomer, Cathy Frankel, played by Terri Treas.

TV Guide included the series in their 2013 list of 60 shows that were "Cancelled Too Soon".

Plot
The series is set in the near future in the United States. In 1990, a flying saucer crashes in the Mojave Desert containing a race of extraterrestrials, the Tenctonese, escaping from slavery under a cruel Overseer race.  They are humanoid but have certain anatomical differences and have been bred with greater physical strength and intelligence.  These Newcomers, as they are called, are accepted as the latest immigrants to the US. The series explores issues around their integration into the multicultural society of the US.

The storylines often are morality plays on the evils of racism and bigotry, using Newcomers as the discriminated minority. As fictional extraterrestrial immigrants, the Newcomers could stand in for social issues about various races, as well as sexual minorities such as gays and lesbians, and would invert the usual expectations. For instance, during the run of the series, George becomes pregnant (the male of his species carrying the fetus for part of its gestation), and during much of the episode, dialog included lines like, "If you females had to feel the pain we males feel during pregnancy, there wouldn't be any babies."  The series offers social commentary by illustrating what it means to be human and the often bizarre rituals we observe.

Cast

Production

Development
In an April 2, 2008 episode of Fanboy Radio (#463), creator Johnson explains: Having been responsible for science-fiction television series such as The Six Million Dollar Man, V and The Incredible Hulk, was approached for the television adaptation of the 1988 film Alien Nation.  He had no interest in the project and agreed to watch the film which left him unimpressed except for one scene when a Newcomer, George, leaves his suburban wife and child and goes to work.
Johnson returned to the network, which envisioned a weekly science-fiction version of Lethal Weapon, and sold them on a different concept of social commentary about what happens when a new minority appears overnight.  He intended his version to be more akin to the film In the Heat of the Night than a traditional action film.

Changes from the movie

 In the movie version, human detective "Matthew Sykes" is played by James Caan. In the TV series, actor Gary Graham plays the role of "Matthew Sikes".
 Detective George Francisco, (originally named "Sam Francisco" by the Human immigration authorities) the Newcomer detective, is played by Mandy Patinkin in the movie. Eric Pierpoint plays the character in the TV series.
 Many aspects of Newcomer culture are explored in the TV series, including childbirth, religion, family, history and longing for their home planet. In the movie, Newcomer culture is hinted at but never fully explored or rounded out.
 In the movie, Francisco has a wife named Susan (played by Kendall Conrad) and a son (called "George Jr." in the credits, although Mandy Patinkin states that within the film, he was named "Richard" after Richard Nixon), played by Brian Lando. In the TV series, his wife is still named Susan (Michele Scarabelli), but his son is named Buck (Sean Six). He also has a daughter, Emily (Lauren Woodland) and gives birth to an additional daughter, Vessna.
 In the movie, Sykes's daughter is married. In the TV series, she is unmarried and is of college age with a boyfriend.
 Matt and George both work for Captain Warner (Francis X. McCarthy) in the movie. In the TV series, it is Captain Bryon Grazer (Ron Fassler).

Cancellation
The weekly series ran for one season, from 1989 through 1990, and was one of the few successes the fledgling Fox Network had at the time. However, the network suffered from financial shortage caused by lower-than-expected advertising income. As a result, Fox executives cancelled all of their dramatic series for the 1990–1991 season. A second season of Alien Nation was clearly expected by the producers, as the season ended with a cliffhanger. The show built a strong fan base, and popular demand led to "Dark Horizon", the episode that would have begun the second season, being novelized and adapted as a comic book as well as spawning a series of novels. Four years later, after a change of management at Fox, the story of Alien Nation continued with five television movies (including all the original cast), picking up with the cliffhanger.

Episodes
A spaceship transporting slaves from an alien planet, crash landed on earth. While trying to integrate into human society, the “Newcomers” are accepted by some and hated by others.

Television movies

Home media
The series was released on DVD by 20th Century Fox on January 3, 2006. The five telefilms that followed after the series was cancelled were released in Region 1 by Best Buy exclusively on September 11, 2007, and worldwide on April 15, 2008.

Revival
In June 2009, Syfy (formerly Sci-Fi Channel) announced that they were developing a new take on the series. Tim Minear (Angel, Firefly) was announced to pen the series. But later in 2014, it was reported that the series was cancelled by the network in favor of paranormal reality shows and professional wrestling. In 2015, it was reported that a remake of the series was again in the works, with Art Marcum and Matt Holloway writing the script.

References

External links

1980s American science fiction television series
1990s American science fiction television series
Fox Broadcasting Company original programming
Live action television shows based on films
Television series by 20th Century Fox Television
Alien Nation
Television shows set in Los Angeles
Television series set in 1995
Television series set in 1996
Fictional portrayals of the Los Angeles Police Department
1989 American television series debuts
1990 American television series endings
Television series about extraterrestrial life